Carcerato is a 1951 Italian melodrama film directed by  (credited as Armando Zorri).

Cast
Otello Toso
Franca Marzi
Barbara Florian
Renato Baldini
Nuccia Aronne
Amedeo Trilli
Franco Pesce
Amalia Pellegrini
Salvatore Cafiero
Gigi Pisano
Natale Cirino

References

External links
 

1951 films
1950s Italian-language films
1951 drama films
Italian drama films
Melodrama films
Italian black-and-white films
1950s Italian films